Macareae or Makareai, also known as Macaria or Makaria (Μακαρία), was a town of ancient Arcadia, in the district Parrhasia, 22 stadia from Megalopolis, on the road to Phigaleia, and 2 stadia from the Alpheius. It was in ruins in the time of Pausanias (2nd century), as its inhabitants had been removed to Megalopolis upon the foundation of the latter (371 BCE). According to Greek mythology, it was founded by Macareus, a son of Lycaon.

Its site is located near the modern Alfeios.

References

Populated places in ancient Arcadia
Former populated places in Greece
Cities in ancient Greece
Parrhasia